Wrona is a surname of Polish-language origin, meaning crow. It may refer to:

 Anthony Wrona (1926-2000), American luthier
 Leszek Wrona (born 1955), Polish footballer
 Marcin Wrona (1973-2015), Polish director
 Marek Wrona, Polish cyclist
 Michael Wrona (born 1966), Australian horse-racing announcer
 Rick Wrona (born 1963), baseball player
 Tadeusz Wrona (disambiguation), multiple people
 Zdzisław Wrona, Polish cyclist

See also
 
 Nowa Wrona, Nowy Dwór Mazowiecki County
 Nowa Wrona, Płońsk County

Polish-language surnames